This article is a list of the current Denver Broncos broadcasters. As of the start of the 2015 NFL season, the Broncos' flagship radio station is KOA 850 AM, a 50,000-watt station in Denver, Colorado owned by iHeartMedia. Dave Logan is the play-by-play announcer; he starred for the Colorado Buffaloes before beginning his NFL career, spent mostly with the Cleveland Browns. Rick Lewis is the color commentator. Preseason games not selected for airing on national television were briefly on KCNC, channel 4, which is a CBS owned-and-operated station, as well as other CBS affiliates around the Rocky Mountain region, from 2004 through 2010. The games had for years previously been on KUSA, channel 9, an NBC affiliate, and in 2011, the team returned to KUSA, which has higher news ratings.

The first Broncos network was headed by KBTR; in the team's final season with that station, 1963, there were 15 affiliates. KTLN (known as KTLK beginning in 1969) took over for the rest of the decade; 53 stations were on the network in KTLK's final season of 1969. KOA's first season as network flagship was 1970.

Radio affiliates

Broncos Radio Network

Colorado

Kansas

Nebraska

New Mexico

Nevada

Oklahoma

South Dakota

Texas

Wyoming

References

Denver Broncos
Denver Broncos
 
National Football League on the radio
Denver Broncos lists